is a district of Shibuya, Tokyo, Japan.

As of October 2020, the population of this district is 1,818. The postal code for Sakuragaokachō is 150–0031.

Cerulean Tower and the Shibuya campus of the Japan University of Economics are located here.

Education
 operates public elementary and junior high schools.

All of Sakuragaokachō is zoned to Jinnan Elementary School (神南小学校), and Shoto Junior High School (松濤中学校).

References

Neighborhoods of Tokyo
Districts of Shibuya